The Volnaya is a river in Moscow Oblast, Russia. It is a left tributary of the Nerskaya (Moskva tributary).

References 

 Russian: Вагнер Б. Б. Реки и озера Подмосковья. — М.: Вече, 2007. — С. 51–52. .

Rivers of Moscow Oblast